Michelle Attoh is a Ghanaian actress, television presenter and the C.E.O. of Marketing and Events company. She was born in Ghana to veteran Ghanaian actress, Rama Brew.

Career
Michelle is the host of Today's Woman on TV3. Some of the other roles she has taken up in her career are listed below.

References 

Living people
Ghanaian film actresses
21st-century Ghanaian actresses
Year of birth missing (living people)